Zusmarshausen is a municipality in the district of Augsburg, Bavaria, Germany. The 1648 Battle of Zusmarshausen took place here.

It lies on the river Zusam and is a part of the Augsburg Western Woods Nature Park. Its districts are Friedensdorf, Gabelbach, Gabelbachergreut, Steinekirch, Streitheim, Vallried, Wollbach, Wörleschwang and Zusmarshausen itself.

Local council (Marktgemeinderat)

The local council has 20 members (Elections in March 2014):
 CSU: 8 seats
 Wählergruppe Freie Wählervereinigung: 7 seats
 SPD/Aktives Bürgerforum: 5 seats

Bernhard Uhl has served as the mayor of Zusmarshausen since 2014 and was reelected on 15 March 2020 with 63.6% of votes cast. Uhl's predecessor as mayor of Zusmarshausen was Albert Lettinger (FWV) (1996–2014).

References

Augsburg (district)